Mykola Mykolayovych Milchev (born 3 November 1967) is a Ukrainian sport shooter. He is the 2000 Olympic champion in skeet shooting. With a perfect score of 150, he set an Olympic record and tied the world record.

Career
Milchev won gold at the 2000 Summer Olympics in Sydney, Australia. The skeet rules were changed in 2005, removing the old world records, but in May 2009 at the ISSF World Cup in Cairo, he once again achieved a perfect qualification score of 125 to equal the world record.

Milchev served as Ukraine's flagbearer at the 2016 Summer Olympics in Rio de Janeiro.

References

External links

1967 births
Living people
Ukrainian male sport shooters
Skeet shooters
Olympic shooters of Ukraine
Shooters at the 2000 Summer Olympics
Shooters at the 2016 Summer Olympics
Olympic gold medalists for Ukraine
World record holders in shooting
Olympic medalists in shooting
Shooters at the 2015 European Games
European Games competitors for Ukraine

Medalists at the 2000 Summer Olympics
Shooters at the 2019 European Games
K. D. Ushinsky South Ukrainian National Pedagogical University alumni
21st-century Ukrainian people